The Cove is a residential complex at the Tanjung Bungah suburb near the city of George Town in Penang, Malaysia. Located at Jalan Tanjung Bungah, it consists of four condominium towers - A, B, C & D. 

All four blocks were developed by City Associates Group, a local private limited firm.

History 
Initially, Towers A, B, C and D were built in 2007.

Next door the One Tanjong project was completed in 2015 and is sometimes incorrectly referred to as "Towers E and F" of The Cove.

See also 
List of tallest buildings in George Town
 Tanjung Bungah

References 

2007 establishments in Malaysia
Buildings and structures in George Town, Penang
Residential skyscrapers in Malaysia
Buildings and structures completed in 2017